Sir Lynch Salusbury Cotton, 4th Baronet (c. 1705 – 14 August 1775) was a Member of Parliament (MP) for Denbighshire.

He was the son of Sir Thomas Cotton and his wife Philadelphia Lynch. He was the younger brother of the 3rd Baronet, Robert Salusbury Cotton who predeceased him without issue in 1748 and whom he thereby succeeded as 4th Baronet. He married a distant cousin, Elizabeth Abigail Cotton.

In December 1749 he replaced, unopposed, Sir Watkin Williams-Wynn as Knight of the Shire for Denbighshire, a seat he retained until 1774.

In 1769, he built St Mary's and St Michael's Church, Burleydam, near his family seat of Combermere Abbey in Cheshire.

He had four sons and was succeeded by his eldest son, Sir Robert Salusbury Cotton, 5th Baronet.

References

ThePeerage.com

1700s births
1775 deaths
Baronets in the Baronetage of England
Members of the Parliament of Great Britain for Welsh constituencies
British MPs 1747–1754
British MPs 1754–1761
British MPs 1761–1768
British MPs 1768–1774